James Avery Artisan Jewelry is a private company that designs, manufactures, and sells jewelry, primarily Christian themed. The founder, James Avery, started the business in 1954 in Kerrville, Texas out of his (then) mother-in-law's two-car garage with about $250 in capital. In 1954, James Avery built a workbench and fashioned a sign to hang on the garage; it read "James Avery Craftsman" and featured a candelabra logo. The business has grown to about 50 of its own stores in Colorado, Georgia, Louisiana, Oklahoma, Tennessee, North Carolina, Missouri, Kansas, Arkansas, Alabama, and Texas. The company has five manufacturing plants in Hondo, Fredericksburg, Kerrville, and two in Comfort, Texas. The James Avery jewelry collection carries 1,100 designs and 14,000 pieces made in sterling silver, 14-, 18-karat yellow and white gold, and gemstones.

History 
In the first year of business, Avery sold $5,500 worth of jewelry, and $7,500 the following year. He eventually moved his business to a studio he built in his house close by. By 1957, Avery created his first catalog consisting of 16 pages and 39 items for sale. Also that year he hired his first employee, Fred Garcia. The business continued to spread throughout the state of Texas with items being sold in clothing boutiques and church gift shops. By 1965, the jewelry store was incorporated into James Avery Craftsman, Inc., and soon after in 1967, Avery bought  of land where the corporate headquarters would soon stand.

By the 1970s the company employed 35 people and generated $400,000 in sales. Avery's jewelry became very popular in camps in the Texas Hill Country and still is today. In 1971, Chuck Wolfmueller, a student at the University of Texas working on a master's degree in business, was hired to help grow the business. Wolfmueller initiated a number of changes and the business saw a 40 percent increase in his first year of employment. In 1988, James Avery was named San Antonio Entrepreneur of the Year. Later, in 2007, Avery was replaced as CEO by his son, Chris M. Avery and Chris has been the Chief Executive Officer of James Avery Craftsman, Inc. since May 2007 and has been its President since 1991. Additionally, Paul Avery has been Director of James Avery Craftsman since 2004 and also serves as its Executive Vice President. James Avery died on April 30, 2018.

The first retail store was established in Kerrville, TX in 1973.

References 

1954 establishments in Texas
American jewelry designers
Companies based in Kerrville, Texas
Jewelry retailers of the United States